Eupithecia macdunnoughi is a moth in the family Geometridae first described by Rindge in 1952. It is found in the western US states of California, Arizona, Nevada, Utah and Colorado.

The wingspan is about 18 mm.

References

Moths described in 1952
macdunnoughi
Moths of North America